David Orobosa Omoregie (born 5 June 1998), also known as Santan Dave,  or just Dave, is an English rapper. He has gained acclaim for his socially conscious lyricism and wordplay.

Dave released his debut extended play Six Paths in 2016, after the release of a number of successful singles including the grime song "Thiago Silva" with AJ Tracey. In the same year, Canadian rapper Drake premiered a remix single of Dave's song "Wanna Know" featuring himself on OVO Sound Radio. Dave released his second EP Game Over in 2017. In 2018, his political song "Question Time", which directed criticism towards the British Government, won the Ivor Novello Award for Best Contemporary Song. In the same year he released "Funky Friday", featuring Fredo, which became his first number-one song on the UK Singles Chart and his first platinum certified release.

Dave's debut album Psychodrama (2019) was met with widespread critical acclaim and debuted at number one on the UK Albums Chart, having the biggest first week streams for a UK rap album. It went on to win the Mercury Prize, and Album of the Year at the 2020 Brit Awards. He made his acting debut in the third season of the Netflix series Top Boy, which was released in September 2019. In July 2021, Dave released his record breaking sophomore album We're All Alone in This Together which was a critical success and his second UK number-one album. He released the single "Starlight" on 3 March 2022, which became his longest-running and his first solo UK number-one single.

Early life 
David Orobosa Omoregie was born on 5 June 1998 in Angell Town, in the Brixton area of South London, to Nigerian parents from the Edo ethnic group. His father, Frank Omoregie, a pastor and his mother, Juliet Doris Omoregie, a nurse. He has two older brothers, Benjamin and Christopher, who are eight and five years older than him respectively. Dave's father was deported to Nigeria when Dave was just a few months old due to visa issues; he had believed he was travelling on a missionary visa but was actually on a visitor's visa. Dave's mother had to flee with his brothers due to fear of deportation herself and was not reunited with Dave until three months later. The family was then left homeless for a period and had to make a home on South London's buses.

Dave moved to Streatham, South London from nearby Brixton at the age of 7. He began composing music at an early age; he started writing lyrics at 11 after watching his older brother practise rapping at home and he taught himself piano after receiving an electric keyboard from his mother for Christmas when he was 14. Both of Dave's older brothers were in prison throughout his teenage years. When Dave was 11, his brother Christopher, who is currently still in prison, was sentenced to life imprisonment with a minimum of 18 years, under the law of joint enterprise, for his involvement in the March 2010 gang murder of 15-year-old Sofyen Belamouadden at London Victoria station. Then in 2014, when Dave was 15, his other brother Benjamin went to prison for four years for robbery, he was released in 2018.

Dave attended St Mark's Academy in Mitcham, and Richmond upon Thames College in Twickenham, where he studied law, philosophy, ethics, while also completing an additional module in sound design and politics. He secured a place at De Montfort University in Leicester to study law but never attended, choosing instead to focus on his musical career. Dave is also an avid supporter of Manchester United F.C.

Music career

2015–2016: Career beginnings and Six Paths
 That July he dropped a single with just audio on Mixtape Madness called "Mid Summer Night". He then progressed, releasing a freestyle entitled ‘Karma’ on the channel PacmanTV in August and a freestyle on Street Starz TV, a YouTube channel for freestyle, in September. Dave performed his first SB.TV Warm Up Session in November and then he released his first track "JKYL+HYD" on the platform in January 2016. In March he made his debut performance on Charlie Sloth's "Fire in the Booth", a freestyle segment on BBC Radio 1Xtra. Later that month, Dave performed his first live show with a support slot for Kano at London's Troxy.

Dave featured on the remix of fellow British rapper AJ Tracey's track "Spirit Bomb" in February 2016. Following this the pair released the track "Thiago Silva" on 13 May 2016. The song showcased Dave's versatility by showing Dave's ability on a Grime track. The song has since been ranked number 10 on Complex magazine's list of "Grime's Most Impactful Songs of the 2010s". Dave's festival debut was at Bestival in August 2016,  performing the track alongside AJ Tracey on the Eskimo Dance stage. He performed as part of the Red Bull Music Academy UK tour in October 2016.

After releasing a range of non-album singles through 2016, Dave released his debut EP, Six Paths, on 30 September 2016, which included the tracks "Picture me", "Panic Attack", and "Wanna Know". The extended play was produced by Dave, Fraser T Smith, and 169, and entered at number 76 on the UK Albums Chart. Dave performed a Maida Vale session for BBC Radio 1, playing his track "Picture Me" live on piano, after his EP release. Dave also performed his first ever headline show in Camden Assembly.

In October 2016, Drake premiered a remix to Dave's song "Wanna Know" on OVO Sound Radio, which also featured Drake and was released as a single. The song debuted at 72 on the Official Singles Chart and peaked at 51, becoming Dave's first entry on the chart.

2017–2018: Game Over and Singles 

Throughout 2017, Dave released a series of non-album singles. The track "Samantha" with J Hus peaked at 63 on the Official Singles Chart, becoming the third biggest song to not chart in the top 40 in 2017, Dave also released the tracks "Revenge", "Tequila", and "100M's", the latter of which featured on Nike's Born Mercurial advert in 2018. Dave made his television debut in May on BBC's Later... with Jools Holland where he performed his song ‘Picture Me’ alongside playing the piano.

Dave toured throughout the first half of the year performing a few sold-out headline shows in the UK including two nights at O2 Academy Islington and making his first appearances at festivals such as Wireless and Reading and Leeds Festival. He also toured North America for the first time on a joint tour with AJ Tracey.

On 9 October 2017, Dave announced his second extended play, Game Over. The EP was preceded by the track "Question Time". During the song Dave hosts his own "Question Time" posing pointed questions directly at the Prime Minister at that time, Theresa May, the former PM, David Cameron, and the then leader of the Labour Party in 2017, Jeremy Corbyn. The EP Game Over was released on 3 November 2017 independently for streaming and digital download alongside the single "No Words". Game Over debuted at number 13 on the UK Albums Chart and 'No Words' debuted at 18 before eventually peaking at 17 on 11 January 2018. Following the release of the EP Dave toured a sold-out tour in the UK and Australia, the later of which he was touring for the first time.

Dave won his first MOBO Award for the Best Newcomer Act at the 2017 ceremony on 29 November 2017. He received his first Brit Award nomination for British Breakthrough Act at the 2018 Brit Awards which he lost out to Dua Lipa. Dave also became the youngest ever winner of an Ivor Novello Award at the age of 19, winning Best Contemporary Song for his politically charged track "Question Time" at the 2018 Awards.

Dave put out his first single after the release of his Game Over EP with the track "Hangman" on 27 February 2018. In the autumn Dave embarked on his first ever tour of Europe. After a seven-month hiatus, Dave released the self-produced track "Funky Friday", featuring rapper Fredo, on 4 October 2018. The song debuted at number one on the UK Singles Chart, being only the third song to do so in 2018. It became the first song by a British rapper to peak at number one on the UK Singles Chart as a lead artist since 2015. This feat also meant that Dave secured his first ever number one single, as well as his first Top 10 single.

2019–2020: Psychodrama 

In January 2019, Dave collaborated with UK rapper Headie One, featuring on the track "18Hunna" which charted at number 6 on the UK Singles Chart. Dave also collaborated again with Fredo, featuring on his track "All I Ever Wanted" off of Fredo's album Third Avenue.

Dave announced his long anticipated debut album Psychodrama on 21 February 2019. Alongside the announcement he released the lead single "Black", which discusses what it means to be black in its complexities; his pride and celebration of being black alongside the challenges that black people face. The video for the song included many prominent black British figures with Damson Idris, Dr Anne-Marie Imafidon, Dina Asher-Smith, Ozwald Boateng, Raheem Sterling, Stormzy, Micheal Ward and Tiffany Calver all appearing.

His debut album Psychodrama was released on 8 March 2019. The album debuted at number one in the UK, selling 26,390 copies in its first week, with 79% of its total generated by 26.3 million streams, this gave it the biggest first week streams for a British rap album, eclipsing Stormzy's Gang Signs & Prayer. Elsewhere, the songs "Disaster", "Streatham", and "Location" debuted at 8, 9, and 11, respectively on the UK Singles Chart. Psychodrama is currently one of the top 100 highest-rated hip-hop albums on Metacritic.

The tracks "Disaster", featuring J Hus, and "Location", featuring Burna Boy, both produced by Jae5, alongside Fraser T. Smith and Dave, were officially released as singles off the album in July 2019. Both tracks have since gone platinum with "Location" becoming one of Dave's biggest tracks to date, having been BPI certified 3× platinum with 1,800,000 units sold as of October 2021.

Following the release of the album, Dave embarked on his first UK headline tour since 2017, which included two nights at Brixton Academy. He also went on to tour Australia, Europe, and North America.

On 30 June 2019 Dave made his Glastonbury Festival debut. During the performance he brought a fan onstage to perform his song "Thiago Silva" alongside him, which the video of subsequently went viral. Following this the track entered the UK Singles Chart at number 57 and reached a peak of number 36. Dave also performed for the first time at Reading and Leeds Festival headlining the BBC Radio 1 Stage.

Dave made his acting debut in Netflix's revival and third series of Top Boy, playing the character Modie. He released two tracks, "Professor X" and "God's Eye", for the soundtrack, which were both self-produced.

On 19 September 2019, Dave won the 2019 Mercury Prize for his debut album Psychodrama. Dave also won British Album of the Year at the 2020 Brit Awards. This made him only the second artist ever to win both of these awards for the same album. Dave's performance of the track "Black" at the Brit Awards, led to controversy, after he called the Uk Prime Minister Boris Johnson a "real racist" and called out the government over their treatment of the victims of Grenfell Tower and the Windrush generation. The track won Dave another Ivor Novello Award for Best Contemporary Song at the 2020 awards. He also won the GQ Men Of The Year Vero Breakthrough Music Act Award at 2019 GQ Men of the Year Awards.

In August 2020, Dave collaborated with Sir David Attenborough for a special episode of Planet Earth entitled Planet Earth: A Celebration, with Dave playing the piano alongside famous composer Hans Zimmer. In October 2020, Dave collaborated with Fraser T. Smith in the production of Smith's debut album, 12 Questions.

2021–present: We're All Alone in This Together 

In January 2021, Dave worked again with frequent collaborator Fredo. Dave featured on and produced, Fredo's track "Money Talks" which debuted at number 3 on the UK Singles Chart. The song was a single off Fredo's album Money Can't Buy Happiness which Dave executively produced under the name SANTAN.

In April 2021, Dave released two songs as a two-track EP, "Titanium", and "Mercury", featuring Kamal, labelled as leftovers from his second album. Two months later, Dave announced his sophomore album, We're All Alone in This Together, alongside its cover art and release date. On 9 July the lead single, "Clash" featuring Stormzy, was released, which peaked at number two on the UK Singles Chart.  The music video features Dave and Stormzy surrounded by cars at the Aston Martin factory in Warwickshire and driving round the Silverstone Circuit. This came after Dave had collaborated with Aston Martin in March 2021, for the launch of their AMR21 Formula 1 car.

On 23 July 2021, Dave released his second album, We're All Alone in This Together. It debuted at number one on the UK Albums Chart, becoming Dave's second consecutive number one album. It was also Dave's first number one album on the Scottish Albums Chart and the Irish Albums Chart. We're All Alone in This Together sold 74,000 album equivalent units in its first week, with 43.9% of its total coming from the 38.5 million streams across the 12 tracks, a new record in terms of weekly album streams for a UK rap act. On the UK Singles Chart the tracks "Clash", "Verdansk", and "In the Fire" reached number 2, 4, and 6, respectively. UK chart rules prevent artists from having more than three songs in the top 40 at once, otherwise data showed that all 12 album tracks would have entered the Top 20. These first week sales broke multiple records, making it the biggest opening week of an album in the UK since November 2019 with Coldplay's album Everyday Life and the biggest first week sales for a UK hip hop/rap album in the last decade, since Tinie Tempah's debut Disc-Overy in October 2010. The album returned to number one on 13 August 2021, three weeks after its release. After the release, Dave headlined his first festival at Parklife on 11 September.

In August 2021, Dave won his third Ivor Novello Award alongside Fraser T Smith in the Best Contemporary Song category for the track "Children of the Internet". Dave continued to produce for other artists, producing the track "End of the Beginning" on Central Cee's mixtape 23, again under the name SANTAN, which was released in February 2022.

Dave was nominated for four awards at the 2022 Brit Awards, including best album, best artist and best song and he won the award for Best British Hip Hop/Rap/Grime Act. He performed his track "In the Fire" at the ceremony, bringing onstage the track's featured guests – Fredo, Meekz, Ghetts and Giggs – and performing a solo on the guitar, which he had only been learning for four months prior.

He embarked on his first sold-out UK arena tour in early 2022, which included two shows at the O2 arena. Dave then carried on his tour to Europe and North America. In March 2022, he released his first single of the year, "Starlight". It debuted at number one on the UK Singles chart as the biggest single debut of the year making for Dave's second chart-topping single and his 11th top 10 single. The song broke a number of records. It became the first UK number one of the 2020s to be entirely written and performed by one person and the first number one to be written and produced by just one person since 2014. It also became the longest-running Number 1 solo UK Rap single in Official Charts history.

Dave won Songwriter of the Year at the 67th Ivor Novello Awards in May, making that his fourth Ivor Novello  win in five years.

Dave performed at a number of festivals over the summer including headlining Wireless Festival, Longitude Festival, Rolling Loud Toronto and becoming the youngest ever solo headliner of Reading and Leeds Festival.

Musical style 
Alongside rapping Dave also produces, plays piano,  and plays guitar.Streatham, South London-born rapper Dave (aka Santan Dave) may only have been 16 when he entered the rap spotlight, but his conscious lyrical style made him sound well beyond his years [...] his brothers would end up serving lengthy prison sentences. To cope with the drastic alteration to their lives, Dave burrowed even deeper into his music, causing him to develop a socially aware form of wordplay that set him apart from his peers. — AllMusic writer Liam Martin

Discography

Studio albums

Extended plays

Singles

As lead artist

As featured artist

Other charted and certified songs

Other guest appearances

Filmography

Awards and nominations

References

External links
  – official site
 

1998 births
Living people
Black British male rappers
Brit Award winners
English hip hop musicians
English male rappers
English record producers
English people of Nigerian descent
People from Streatham
Rappers from London
People educated at St Mark's Academy